Tawanda Blessing Chirewa is a Zimbabwean professional footballer who plays as a midfielder for Ipswich Town.

Club career

Ipswich Town
Chirewa made his debut for Ipswich Town on 12 November 2019, appearing as a second-half substitute in a 0–1 away loss to Colchester United in an EFL Trophy group stage match, he became the second youngest player to make his first-team debut for the club, after Connor Wickham, at 16 years and 31 days old. On 14 July 2020 it was announced that Chirewa had signed a two-year scholarship with Ipswich.

He signed his first professional contract with Ipswich on 2 November 2020, signing a deal until 2022, with the option of an additional year extension.

Career statistics

References

External links

Living people
Zimbabwean footballers
Association football midfielders
Ipswich Town F.C. players
2003 births